Olga Viktorovna Khrzhanovskaya (née Chukanova (born 9 June 1980 in Temirtau) is a Russian volleyball player. She was a member of the national team that won the silver medal at the 2004 Summer Olympics in Athens. She currently plays for Universitet Belgorod.

References
 sports-reference

1980 births
Living people
Russian women's volleyball players
Olympic volleyball players of Russia
Volleyball players at the 2004 Summer Olympics
Olympic silver medalists for Russia
People from Temirtau
Olympic medalists in volleyball
Medalists at the 2004 Summer Olympics
20th-century Russian women
21st-century Russian women